Matheus Santos (born ) is a Brazilian indoor volleyball player. He is a current member of the Brazil men's national volleyball team.

Career
He participated at the 2017 FIVB Volleyball Men's U23 World Championship and 2019 FIVB Volleyball Men's World Cup.

Sporting achievements

National team
 2018  Pan-American Cup
 2019  Pan American Games
 2019  South American Championship

Individual
 2017 FIVB U23 World Championship – Best Middle Blocker

References

External links
 FIVB Biography

1996 births
Living people
Brazilian men's volleyball players
Place of birth missing (living people)
Pan American Games medalists in volleyball
Pan American Games bronze medalists for Brazil
Volleyball players at the 2019 Pan American Games
Medalists at the 2019 Pan American Games
Sportspeople from Brasília